Carl Chiarenza (born 1935) is an American art photographer. He works predominantly in black and white photography. From 1979, he has worked entirely in the studio, creating abstract compositions using materials such as torn paper and aluminum foil.

Life

Chiarenza was born in Rochester, New York in 1935, to parents that had immigrated there from Italy. He studied with Minor White and Ralph Hattersley at the Rochester Institute of Technology. He was active in Boston, Massachusetts for three decades, beginning in 1957. He earned a Ph.D. from Harvard University in 1973, and was Professor of Art History at Boston University until 1986. He became a Professor of Art History at the University of Rochester beginning in 1986, where he eventually became Chair of Art and Art History. He is currently Professor Emeritus and Artist in Residence there.

Exhibitions and collections
Chiarenza's photographs have been shown in more than 80 solo exhibitions and more than 250 group exhibitions, starting in 1957, and are in the collections of the Museum of Modern Art, the Art Institute of Chicago, the George Eastman Museum, the Philadelphia Museum of Art, and the Los Angeles County Museum of Art, as well as many other institutions.

Publications
Aaron Siskind: Pleasures and Terrors, Boston, 1982
Landscapes of the Mind, David R. Godine, Boston, 1988
Evocations, Nazraeli Press, Tucson, 2002
Peace Warriors of Two Thousand and Three, Nazraeli Press, Tucson, 2004
Solitudes, Lodima Press, 2005
Interaction: Verbal / Visual, Nazraeli Press, Tucson, 2006
Pictures Come from Pictures, David R Godine, Boston, 2008

References

External links
Image galleries

1935 births
Living people
20th-century American photographers
21st-century American photographers
Photographers from New York (state)
University of Rochester faculty
Rochester Institute of Technology alumni
Harvard University alumni